The St. Stanislaus Church is a Catholic church in neoclassical style in Saint Petersburg in northwest Russia.

The church was built by Bishop Stanisław Bohusz Siestrzeńcewicz (1731–1826), the first Archbishop of Mogilev Saint Petersburg in 1783, who donated money and land which used to be his residence. The church, built between 1823 and 1825, is the work of Italian architect David Visconti. It has a capacity of seven hundred people. A year after the consecration, the archbishop was buried there. This was the second Catholic church built after the St. Catherine on Nevsky Prospekt. The parish had 10,200 faithful on the eve of the 1917 revolution had a parochial school and a charity. Bishop Antoni Malecki (1861–1935), who was deported to Siberia in 1930, officiated there from 1887 to 1921. A plaque commemorates his memory in the church.

After the fall of communism the church was registered again in 1992.

See also
Roman Catholicism in Russia
St. Stanislaus

References

Roman Catholic churches in Saint Petersburg
Roman Catholic churches completed in 1825
Church buildings with domes
19th-century Roman Catholic church buildings in Russia
Cultural heritage monuments of federal significance in Saint Petersburg
Neoclassical church buildings in Russia